Walnut Grove School may refer to:

Walnut Grove School (Osage, Iowa), listed on the National Register of Historic Places in Mitchell County, Iowa
Walnut Grove School (Caneyville, Kentucky), listed on the National Register of Historic Places in Grayson County, Kentucky
Walnut Grove Secondary School, Langley, British Columbia, Canada

See also
 Walnut Grove School District (disambiguation)